Inorganic Syntheses is a book series which aims to publish "detailed and foolproof" procedures for the synthesis of inorganic compounds. Although this series of books are edited, they usually are referenced like a journal, without mentioning the names of the checkers (referees) or the editor.  A similar format is usually followed for the series Organic Syntheses.

Volumes

See also
 Organic Syntheses

References

Book series introduced in 1939
Chemistry books